The key characteristic of dry grasslands is that they have low-growing plants, causing the area to be quite open. They also have a mottled structure, which leads to a biome with sunny or semi-shaded areas. On top of that, their soil is relatively dry and nutrient-poor. There are, however, types of grasslands with a higher humus and nutrient content. The soil of these areas overlie acid rocks or deposits such as sands and gravels. Dry grasslands belong to different zones such as: the natural zonal or azonal/extrazonal vegetation and the semi-natural vegetation. Overall, there are 13 classes that fall under dry grasslands.

Dry grassland areas are very important to biodiversity as they contain a wide range of plant and animal species. European dry grasslands have the highest small-scale species densities amongst plant communities. This is why conservation efforts have become vital for dry grasslands, to ensure the continuance of its vast diversity and to help the many endangered species that these areas host.

Dry grasslands have an extreme variability in terms of the species that are found there. These areas contain different types of mammals and a wide range of invertebrates. Grazing animals are needed as they help to create habitat variation within the dry grassland areas.

In general, dry grasslands can be found in Europe and North-America, as well as some small parts of South America. For example, Denmark contains large areas of this type of grassland, which are characterized by short plant cover and the presence of a wide variety of flowers. In the United Kingdom, approximately 30,000 hectares of lowland acid grassland are present.

Dry grasslands are highly threatened in Europe by factors such as: destruction for other activities, abandonment of traditional use, afforestation, eutrophication, or invasion of neophytes. The European Union has dry grasslands falling under the Habitats Directive. This directive ensures that threatened animals and plant species are conserved and protected. Another reason why dry grasslands are important is because they can be used as a model system for biodiversity.

Environment

Geography
Dry grasslands are found in a variety of places around the world. Since dry grasslands have a very wide ecological and geographical amplitude they are able to inhabit many environments, which allow them to be suitable study objects for understanding biodiversity patterns. Most dry grasslands are located in Northern America and Europe. Dry grasslands are widespread in Alaska and northern Canada in cold and dry climates. They are also present in nearly all European regions, other than the Far North. Many different types of environments are able to support the growth of dry grasslands, so it is possible for them to be found all over the world. Despite this, they are rarely found on flat areas.

Types of grasslands
There are four main types of grasslands, which differ slightly in their main characteristics and are found in different areas across the globe:

– Zonal steppes 
These dry grasslands are in lowland areas with temperate climate, receiving little precipitation (less than 450 mm per year). They are distributed through areas in Ukraine, Russia, Kazakhstan, and a few dry grassland areas are found in Bulgaria, Romania, Moldova, Georgia, Armenia, and Azerbaijan.

– Alpine 
These dry grasslands are found in European mountains, where the vegetation growth period is not long enough to sustain forest growth.

– Azonal/extrazonal 
These dry grasslands occur in areas where the zonal vegetation is forest, but with soil that is usually shallow, poorly developed and unstable, and therefore does not allow tree growth.

– Semi-natural (secondary) 
These dry grasslands represent the dominant type in most European countries, growing in places where the natural vegetation is forest. Many of these areas are present due to human land use in the past, which are now replaced by grasslands

Climate
Since dry grasslands are found in various environments, they are able to survive in diverse climate conditions. They are mostly found in temperate to continental areas, which are characterized by warm summers and cold winters because of their wide annual temperature amplitude. Temperatures range from -4 to -6 °C in January and 18 to 20 °C in July, with mean annual temperatures of 7 to 9 °C. Mean annual precipitation ranges from 600 to 650 mm, with maximum precipitation occurring in May and June, and minimum precipitation occurring in January and February.

Abiotic Factors
There is also a range of abiotic factors that dry grasslands can be found in. The following comparison example is used to illustrate the range of abiotic factors in dry grasslands. In Vratsa, a city in Bulgaria, there are dry grasslands with a base rich pH of 6.7, ranging from 4.8 to 8.0 and shows a high humus content with a mean of 23.3%, and a range of 13.4 to 43.9%. Whereas Koprivshtitsa, a smaller town in Bulgaria with a different environment, has a different pH of 5.0, with a range of 4.4 to 6.4 and a low humus content with a mean of 9.1% and a range of 2.3 to 22%. This is proven to match the many other dry grasslands found in other parts of Europe. This contributes to the knowledge that there are a variety of dry grassland environmental conditions, which are even visible in a single country.

Flora

Adaptations
Based on the environmental conditions of dry grasslands there are certain plants that inhabit these areas. The plants on dry grasslands have evolved certain adaptations to allow them to survive in such environments. They have adapted to the nutrient poor soil and the grazing of animals. Some now also have adaptations such as thorns or a bad taste to avoid grazing, whereas others have grown in the zones that are out of reach of present grazers. The grazing of animals on dry grasslands creates a variety of habitats that allow a diverse number of species with habitat differentiation to grow. Around 50 species of plants can be found per square meter. If the overall balance between plants in the area is good, then the plants do not have the struggle for survival as they don’t have to compete for natural resources such as light, water and nutrition. Once a seed has found a spot, it is able to grow there as long as it is able to withstand the constant grazing of animals. If grazing is not part of dry grasslands, then the area will turn into forests as other plant species take over and take the available nutrients needed for growth. The dry grassland plants are not able to compete with the taller herbs found in a typical forest. There is a decline in animals used for grazing, which results in the establishment of trees and bushes in dry grassland areas. As they grow bigger and larger, they start to block the sunlight from reaching the dry grassland species, causing them to die.

Threats
Dry grasslands are threatened and vulnerable habitats all across the globe because they contain both endangered plant and animal species. Therefore, it is very important to maintain dry grasslands, to prevent the extinction of these species. A program by Life-Nature is set up with the aim of increasing the overall area of grasslands and improving the conditions of the already existing ones. This project is co-financed by the European Union. A problem for the majority of these areas is that they are not grazed sufficiently or not grazed properly. This leads other plant species to thrive and take over, causing the dry grassland plant species to have a lack of natural resources that are needed for survival. The aim of this program is to get rid of the overgrowth, as well as start and maintain proper grazing in the future. Besides this, it is also equally important to make the public (more) aware of these areas and the problems that they are facing. This can be done by organizing field trips to the areas so that the people can witness it themselves.

Fauna
Dry grassland areas are predominantly inhabited by grazing animals, but besides livestock and other mammals it also has one of the highest small-scale species densities in the world .

Livestock
Dry grassland grazing animals in Europe are common livestock animals such as goats, cattle and sheep. These animals help prevent the overgrowing of dry grassland by more wood-like plants. Using grazing animals to eat these wood-like plants is considered one of the most natural methods of dry grassland preservation. Even when dry grassland is restored low-intensity grazing of livestock helps to keep the area in good condition. Besides creating more space for typical dry grassland plants to grow, the livestock also creates habitat variation by exposing the soil in some places by walking on it, which creates places for new seeds to grow.

Other Mammals

Predators
Besides livestock, other mammals can also be found in dry grassland areas. It even is the biome with the highest density of Indian foxes (Vulpes bengalensis) in the world, but because of the lack of attention to conservation of dry grassland, research suggest that the Indian fox might become a threatened species in the future. Besides Canidae like the Indian fox, dry grassland can also be populated by Felidae and in particular Geoffroy's cat (Leopardus geoffroyi). This species can be found in the dry grasslands of Argentina and other parts of southern South America. Their main diet is small rodents, which are also common mammals in a dry grassland biome.

Rodents and lagomorphs
In dry grassland areas all over the world different rodents and lagomorphs  can be found. Rodents like voles (Microtes), such as the long-tailed vole, are found in North-America. The plateau pika (Ochotona curzoniae) is a keystone species in the Alpine meadows on the Tibetan plateau, which is an example of one of the rarer lagomorphs in dry grassland biomes. The burrows, which the plateau pika makes, are not only used by this species, but are also used by birds and lizards. Furthermore, they are a key prey animal for predators on the Tibetan plateau.

Insect and other small species
Insects and other small species are very common in dry grassland areas. For example, in Denmark 18,000 insect species can be found including half of all Danish butterfly species. Grasshoppers in the family Acrididae can commonly be found in these areas because of the relatively light rich environment. The lack of nutrients in the soil prevent larger plants and trees to grow, which gives the species in Acredidae a sufficient amount of light to complete their life cycle. This is consistent with the fact that dry grassland is known for specialist invertebrate species, that are not common anywhere else, such as solitary wasps and field cricket (Gryllus campestris). Dry grasslands are important habitats also for ants, where they act ecosystem engineers and contribute to their high biodiversity.

Human Relations
In a lot of different countries with dry grassland areas the land is used for agriculture, which have an effect on the biome and the flora and fauna species living there. In Finland, for example, the grazing of livestock changed the structure of the landscape. This eventually resulted in a decline in species. In the United Kingdom many semi-natural dry grassland areas are used for agriculture, which creates conservation problems, such as the rare dry grassland species becoming extinct. Research suggests that, at least in Europe, a common solution should be looked for in order to conserve dry grassland areas.

References

Bieringer, G. and Klaus, P. Z., 2003.  Shading out species richness: edge effect of a pine plantation on the Orthoptera (Tettigoniidae and Acrididae) assemblage of an adjacent dry grassland. Biodiversity and Conservation 12(7). doi:10.1023/A:1023633911828
Buglife - The Invertebrate Conservation Trust (n.d.). Lowland dry acid grassland. Retrieved from: https://www.buglife.org.uk/advice-and-publications/advice-on-managing-bap-habitats/lowland-dry-acid-grassland
Danish Ministry of the Environment Forest and Nature Agency. (n.d.). Restoration of dry grasslands in Denmark [Brochure]. Nature2000. Retrieved November 1, 2016, from http://ec.europa.eu/environment/life/project/Projects/index.cfm?fuseaction=home.showFile&rep=file&fil=GrasslandsDK_Brochure_EN.pdf 
Dostálek, J. and Franktík, T. (2008). Dry grassland plant diversity conservation using low-intensity sheep and goat grazing management: case study in Prague (Czech Republic). Biodiversity and Conservation, 17(6). doi:10.1007/s10531-008-9352-1
Dry grassland. (n.d.). Retrieved October 31, 2016, from https://www.hogeveluwe.nl/en/discover-the-park/nature-and-landscape/dry-grassland  
Janisova, M. (2009). What are dry grasslands and why are they so interesting? Eurasian Dry Grassland Group. Retrieved from: http://www.edgg.org/dry_grasslands.htm
Hodgson, J. G., Grime, J. P., Wilson, P. J., Thompson, K. and Band, S. R., (2005). The impacts of agricultural change (1963-2003) on the grassland flora of Central England: processes and prospects. Basic and Applied Ecology, 6(2). doi:10.1016/j.baae/2005.01.009
Innes, R. J. (2014). Fire regimes of Alaskan dry grassland communities. In: Fire Effects Information System. U.S. Department of Agriculture, Forest Service, Rocky Mountain Research Station, Missoula Fire Sciences Laboratory (Producer). Retrieved October 31, 2016, 	from http://www.fs.fed.us/database/feis/fire_regimes/AK_dry_grassland/all.html
Internet Center for Wildlife Damage Management (2005). Voles. Retrieved, October 31 from: http://icwdm.org/handbook/rodents/voles.asp 
KuzemKuzemkoko, A. A., Becker, T., Didukh, Y. P., Violeta Arde-lean, I., Becker, U., Beldean, M. and Dengler, J. (2014). Dry grassland vegetation of Central Podolia (Ukraine) – a preliminary overview of its syntaxonomy, ecology and biodiversity. Dry Grassland Vegetation of Central Podolia (Ukraine) – a Preliminary Overview of Its Syntaxonomy, Ecology and Biodiversity. doi:10.14471/2014.34.020 
Lowland Dry Acid Grassland. (n.d.). Retrieved October 31, 2016, from https://web.archive.org/web/20160811155304/http://www.wildlifetrusts.org/wildlife/habitats/lowland-dry-acid-grassland 
Luote, M., Rekolainen, S., Aakkula, J. and Pykälä, J., (2003). Loss of Plant Species Richness and Habitat Connectivity in Grasslands Associated with Agricultural Change in Finland. AMBIO: A Journal of the Human Environment, 32(7). doi:10.1579/0044-7447-32.7.447
Manfredi, C., Lucherini, M., Canepuccia, A. D. and Casanave, E. B. (2004). Geographical Variation in the Diet of Geoffroy's Cat (Oncifelis geoffroyi) in Pampas Grassland of Argentina. Journal of Mammalogy 85.5. doi:10.1644/BWG-133
Mugnai M, Frasconi Wendt C, Balzani P, Ferretti G, Dal Cin M, Masoni A, Frizzi F, Santini G, Viciani D, Foggi B, Lazzaro L. (2021). Small-scale drivers on plant and ant diversity in a grassland habitat through a multifaceted approach. PeerJ 9:e12517 https://doi.org/10.7717/peerj.12517
Pedashenko, H., Apostolova, I., Boch, S., Ganeva, A., Janišová, M., Sopotlieva, D., and Dengler, J. (2013,). Dry grasslands of NW Bulgarian mountains: First insights into diversity, ecology and syntaxonomy. Tuxenia, 33. Pp: 309-346
Rusina, S. (Ed.). (2009). What are dry grasslands and why are they so interesting? Retrieved October 31, 2016, from http://www.edgg.org/dry_grasslands.htm 
Vanak, A. T. and Gompper, M. E. (2010). Multi-scale resource selection and spatial ecology of the Indian fox in a human-dominated dry grassland ecosystem. Journal of Zoology, 281(2). doi:10.1111/j.1469-7998.2010.00690.x
Vrahnakis, M., Janišová, M., Rūsina, S., Török, S. V. and Dengler, J. (n. d. ) The European Dry Grassland Group (EDGG): stewarding Europe's most diverse habitat type. Retrieved from: http://www.biodiversity-plants.de/downloads/JD184.pdf?PHPSESSID=sq63s589f3adf8alvlfmlghvq3

Meadows
Phytogeography
Grasslands